ISO 639 is a standardized nomenclature used to classify languages. Each language is assigned a two-letter (639-1) and three-letter ( and ) lowercase abbreviation, amended in later versions of the nomenclature.

This table lists all of:
 ISO 639-1: two-letter codes, one per language for ISO 639 macrolanguage
And some of:
 ISO 639-2/T: three-letter codes, for the same languages as 639-1

Table of all possible two letter codes

References

External links

 Official ISO 639 list at the Library of Congress
 meta:Template:List of language names ordered by code on Wikimedia

ISO 639
Unique identifiers